After The Wildhearts split with the East West recording label, East West released this compilation album, unendorsed by the band. It was notable for including the UK CD debut of Beautiful Me, Beautiful You and 29 x The Pain '96. A more comprehensive release was issued in Japan in 1997.

UK Track listing
"I Wanna Go Where the People Go"
"TV Tan"
"Sick of Drugs"
"29x the Pain"
"Caffeine Bomb"
"Geordie in Wonderland"
"Suckerpunch"
"Just in Lust"
"Greetings from Shitsville"
"In Lilly's Garden"
"My Baby Is a Headfuck"
"If Life Is Like a Lovebank I Want an Overdraft"
"Nothing Ever Changes But the Shoes"
"Red Light Green Light"
"Beautiful Me, Beautiful You"
"Splattermania"

Time: 62:27 min.

Japanese Track listing
CD1
"Nothing Ever Changes But the Shoes"
"TV Tan"
"Greetings from Shitsville"
"Dreaming In A"
"Suckerpunch"
"My Baby Is a Headfuck"
"The Miles Away Girl"
"Loveshit"
"I Wanna Go Where the People Go"
"Jonesing for Jones"
"Just in Lust"
"Baby Strange"
"Nita Nitro"
"Sick of Drugs"
"Red Light-Green Light"

CD2
"Do Anything"
"Mindslide"
"Beautiful Thing You"
"Got it on Tuesday"
"Friend for 5 Minutes"
"29x the Pain (Original Version)"
"And the Bullshit Goes On"
"Bad Time to Be Having a Bad Time"
"Can't Do Right for Doing Wrong"
"Two Way Idiot Mirror"
"S.I.N (In Sin)"
"Give the Girl a Gun"
"Girlfriend Clothes"
"Sky Chaser High"
"Geordie in Wonderland"

The Wildhearts albums
1996 greatest hits albums
East West Records compilation albums